Ankur Kalra is an Indian interventional cardiologist and research scholar specialised in advanced interventional and structural cardiology, cardiovascular disease, and internal medicine. 
 
Kalra served as an interventional cardiologist in the Section of Invasive and Interventional Cardiology (January 2019 - December 2021) and Medical Director of Clinical Research in the Section of Regional Cardiovascular Medicine (December 2020 - December 2021) at Cleveland Clinic. He was Associate Professor of Medicine at Cleveland Clinic Lerner College of Medicine.

Kalra became an entrepreneur in 2018, when he launched his 501(c)3 non-profit startup, makeadent.org on September 16, 2018, which innovates concepts in healthcare. He is the host of an award-winning, top-ranked cardiology podcast show, Parallax, produced by Radcliffe Group (Wooburn Green, UK) in association with makeadent.org. He is also the author of his maiden poetry book, "Ibadah" that was released on Amazon and Barnes & Noble, and launched in collaboration with Cleveland Clinic Arts and Medicine Institute on Valentine's Day, 2020.

Education 
Ankur Kalra obtained his graduate medical education (MBBS) at Indira Gandhi Medical College (Shimla, India) in 2005. Later in 2009, he left medical training at the All India Institute of Medical Sciences, AIIMS (New Delhi, India) to pursue further training in the United States of America. In 2012, he completed residency in internal medicine from Cooper University Hospital (Camden, NJ).

Kalra became a fellow in cardiovascular disease at Hennepin County Medical Center and Minneapolis Heart Institute (Minneapolis, MN), clinical fellow in interventional cardiology at Beth Israel Deaconess Medical Center (Boston, MA), and a clinical fellow in medicine at the Harvard Medical School (Boston, MA). He then completed a year of advanced interventional and structural cardiology fellowship at Houston Methodist DeBakey Heart and Vascular Center, Houston Methodist Hospital (Houston, TX). He has completed a 1-year certification program in Patient Safety, Healthcare Quality, Health Informatics and Leadership from Harvard Medical School (Boston, MA). He is currently pursuing a Master of Science program in Health Economics, Outcomes and Management in Cardiovascular Sciences from the London School of Economics and Political Science (London, UK).

Research and career 
Kalra’s research interests and specialties include Interventional Cardiology, Hypertrophic Cardiomyopathy, Clinical Cardiology, Health Economics, Health Policy, Aortic Stenosis, Aortic Regurgitation, Arterial Diseases - "blocked arteries' and Valvular Heart Disease. He has presented late-breaking science at national and international scientific cardiovascular meetings, and has published over 270 scientific manuscripts in various peer-reviewed journals.

Awards and honors 
 2022 Most Cited Clinical Research Article, EuroIntervention: Transcatheter Aortic Valve Implantation: Valve-in-valve vs reoperative surgical aortic valve replacement in patients with failed aortic bioprosthesis: insight from Nationwide Readmission Database 
 2022 Ohio Top Doctors Excellence in Medicine, findatopdoc.com
 Expertscape World Expert in Professional Education
 Best of European Heart Journal Digital Health 2021 - Editors’ choice: Mapping and quantification of the Twitter footprint of cardiologists
 TEDx Speaker: The Science and the Art of a Broken Heart
 The Top 100 Twitter Influencers in Cardiology, AIMS Public Health 2021, Volume 8, Issue 4: 743-753
 2021 Top Cardiologist, Ohio Magazine
 Transcatheter Cardiovascular Therapeutics (TCT) 2021 Key Coronary Intervention Abstracts: Invasive versus medical management in patients with chronic kidney disease and non-ST-elevation myocardial infarction
 Transcatheter Valve Therapy (TVT) 2021 Featured Clinical Research: Transcatheter Aortic Valve Replacement: Valve-in-valve vs Reoperative Surgical Aortic Valve Replacement in Patients With Failed Aortic Bioprosthesis: Insight from Nationwide Readmission Database
 2021 Landmark Session: Late-Breaking Trials Presenter, Cardiovascular Research Technologies (CRT Virtual) 2021: Off-label use of direct oral anticoagulants in patients receiving mechanical and bioprosthetic heart valves: insights from The Society Of Thoracic Surgeons National Database
 JACC Journals Best of 2020, JACC: Case Reports: Voices in Cardiology: The Kardashian Index of Cardiologists: Celebrities or Experts?
 Top Altmetric-scoring CardioPulse Papers of All Time (Rank #1), European Heart Journal: COVID-19 and the Healthcare Workers
 Top Five Papers Published since January 1, 2018 (Rank #1), European Heart Journal: COVID-19 and the Healthcare Workers
 2020 Sones-Favaloro Excellence in Research Award, Heart, Vascular and Thoracic Department, Cleveland Clinic
 2020 Scholarship in Teaching Award, Case Western Reserve University School of Medicine: Parallax, a medicine (cardiology) podcast show
 High-impact Clinical Research, Transcatheter Cardiovascular Therapeutics (TCT) 2019 Annual Scientific Sessions: Trends in the use of mechanical circulatory support in the United States: the 2012-2015 National Inpatient Sample
 2019 Marquis Who's Who Top Doctors
 2019 Richard E. Clark Memorial Paper, Society of Thoracic Surgeons
 2018 National Cardiovascular Data Registry (NCDR)/American College of Cardiology (ACC) Travel Award: Electronic health records and outpatient cardiovascular care delivery: insights from the American College of Cardiology’s PINNACLE India Quality Improvement Program (PIQIP)
 2017 Late-Breaking Science Presenter, European Society of Cardiology (ESC) Congress: Leaflet thrombosis following transcatheter aortic valve replacement: insights from the MAUDE database
 2017 Award for Clinical Research Excellence, Division of Cardiology, Houston Methodist DeBakey Heart and Vascular Center, Houston Methodist Hospital: In recognition of clinical research excellence by a Fellow whose efforts were judged to be of the highest standard in terms of originality and impact
 2017 TCTMD Featured Fellow, tctmd.com
 Fellow, Society for Cardiovascular Angiography & Interventions (FSCAI), 2017–present
 Fellow, American College of Cardiology (FACC), 2016–present.
 Fellowship, American College of Physicians, 2014–present

Selected publications

Journals

Books

References

External links 

 Google Scholar

Living people
Cleveland Clinic people
Fellows of the American College of Cardiology
Year of birth missing (living people)